Dolichus is a genus of beetles in the family Carabidae, containing the following species:

 Dolichus davidis Fairmaire, 1889
 Dolichus halensis Schaller, 1783

Dolichus halensis is found across temperate Europe and Asia, and Dolichus davidis is found in China.

References

Platyninae